Nkumba University (NKU) is a chartered private university in Uganda. It was established in 1994 as part of a group of schools and colleges that originally grew from a kindergarten established in 1951. The university is not affiliated with any particular religious organization, but it accommodates several religious associations.

Leadership

Emmanuel Katongole is the University's Chancellor. 
He is the Chairman of the Uganda National Oil Company which handles the state’s commercial interests in the oil and gas sector and is also the chairman of the Advisory Board of London Based TLG Capital which among other private equity engagements, runs a programmatic multi-million dollar fund to support progressive African enterprises.

He is currently the Chairman of the National Response Fund to Covid-19, Board Director of the Presidential CEO Forum and Board Director of Mauritius Union Assurance (MUA) – Uganda.

Emmanuel Katongole is a Rotarian and has steadily and diligently served his Rotary Club of Muyenga as President in 2006/2007, Assistant Governor 2009/2010, Chairman of the 2010/11 District Conference and Assembly and was the 2013/14 District Governor for Rotary District 9211 which comprises Tanzania and Uganda. He was inducted into the Arch Klump society of The Rotary Foundation for his outstanding support to the Foundation’s humanitarian programmes. He further serves as an Endowment and Major Gifts Advisor to the Rotary Foundation.

Prof. Jude T. Lubega is the 5th Vice Chancellor of Nkumba University. Prof. Lubega is a Professor of Information Technology who has vast experience in ICT4D. He is currently the Ag. Vice Chancellor of Nkumba University. He previously served in Makerere University from 2007 t0 2012 as the Deputy Dean and the Head of the Information Technology Department in the College of Computing and Information Sciences. He also served as the deputy Vice chancellor for Uganda Technology and Management University – UTAMU from 2013 to 2019. He has been the Chief Executive Officer for 8Tech Consults one of the leading ICT consulting companies in Uganda. He was listed among the 100 Movers and Shakers in Corporate Online Learning for 2018 in Africa. He also served as the Rotary Club of Namasuba President 2019 – 2020.

He is an experienced ICT4D consultant and has undertaken numerous researches and projects both nationally and internationally. He is a member of several boards and has won several research funding to undertake ICT4D projects. He is formerly a researcher and Lecturer in the School of Systems Engineering at the University of Reading, UK. He has been involved in developing several information systems including election monitoring using mobile devices.

His research interests include Tracking and Assessment in e-learning, Content Authoring, Multimedia, Multi-Agent Systems, Data Science, Knowledge Representation, ICT for Development (E-Governance, E-Health, E-Agriculture), Mobile Computing, ICT Strategic Planning and Management, Web-based Systems and Mobile Learning. He has published widely in journal, books and conference proceedings.

Location
The coordinates of the university campus are 0°05'42.0"N, 32°30'27.0"E (Latitude:0.095000; Longitude:32.507500).

Overview
The university is one of the largest private universities in East Africa. As of December 2011, the student body exceeded 7,000, with over 300 academic staff. Nkumba University is a private, non-denominational, non-profit and non-secular institution which has a Vision of “To be a leading national, regional and global hub for academic and professional excellence”. It Mission is “To provide an environment that enables the cultivation of competence, confidence, creativity and character in the academic, professional and social interaction”.

The university offers courses leading to certificates, diplomas, baccalaureate degrees as well as postgraduate academic qualifications. Nkumba University has graduated close to 30,000 students over the past 27 years. The university was one of the first universities in the country to introduce the Bachelor of Science degree in petroleum studies, mineral management, and technology. The inaugural intake occurred in 2011. A master's degree in the same field is in development.

History
On 29 July 1951, Ssalongo Kintu a local merchant, invited two of his best friends to a meeting: Charles Kisitu Ffulu, the then Parish Chief of Nkumba, and Zefania Mpanga, a civil servant who resided in the area. Their meeting led to the establishment of a kindergarten for their infants. The school opened on 6 February 1952 with twelve pupils at Ffulu's home. Within two years, the student population had grown to over 150.

The kindergarten grew into a primary (elementary) school. Over the years, the school grew into a junior secondary (middle) school and a senior secondary (high) school. In 1969, the school became a vocational school. In 1974, the name of the school was changed to the Nkumba College of Commerce and Advanced Studies. Finally, in 1994, the board of trustees were approved by the Ministry of Education to transform the college into a university. This marked the beginning of Nkumba University. On 16 February 2007, Nkumba University was granted a charter by the president of Uganda upon the recommendation of the National Council for Higher Education as provided in the Universities and Other Tertiary Institutions Act 2001.

Academic Affairs
The academic affairs of Nkumba University are organized under seven constituent schools of the university.

 School of Business Administration and Information Technology
 School of Education, Humanities and Sciences 
 School of Social Sciences 
 School of Law and Institute of Criminal Justice 
 School of Industrial, Commercial Art and Design
 School of Computing and Informatics
 School of Sciences.

Notable alumni
 Doreen Amule - Ugandan politician.
 Katumba Wamala - Ugandan military officer. Current Ugandan Minister of Works and Transport. Former Chief of Defense Forces, the highest military position in the Uganda People's Defence Force.
 Jeje Odongo - Minister of Foreign Affairs of Uganda

See also
Education in Uganda
List of universities in Uganda
List of Business Schools in Uganda
List of Ugandan university leaders

References

Wakiso District
Nkumba University
Business schools in Uganda
Educational institutions established in 1994
1994 establishments in Uganda